Hypomolis aeruginosa is a moth of the family Erebidae. It was described by Felder and Rogenhofer in 1874. It is found in Colombia and Peru.

Subspecies
Hypomolis aeruginosa aeruginosa (Colombia)
Hypomolis aeruginosa roseiventris Toulgoët, 1982 (Peru)

References

 

Arctiini
Moths described in 1874